The 1936 United States Senate election in Kentucky took place on November 3, 1936. Incumbent Democratic Senator M. M. Logan was re-elected to a second term in office over Republican Robert H. Lucas.

General election

Candidates
M. M. Logan, incumbent Senator since 1931 (Democratic)
William M. Likins (Union)
Robert H. Lucas (Republican)
W. E. Sandefer (Socialist)
Ferdinand Zimmerer (Socialist Labor)

Results

See also
1936 United States Senate elections

Notes

References 

1936
Kentucky
United States Senate